Hednota hagnodes is a moth in the family Crambidae. It was described by Turner in 1942. It is found in Australia, where it has been recorded from Western Australia.

References

Crambinae
Moths described in 1942